Daring Women is a 2010 South Korean television series starring Lee Yu-ri, Lee Chang-hoon, Seo Ji-young, and Lee Joong-moon. The morning soap opera aired on SBS on Mondays to Fridays at 8:40 a.m. from March 2 to July 30, 2010 for 105 episodes.

Plot
Ji Soon-young loses her husband, Wang Se-joon, in a tragic accident. She is left alone to take care of their adopted daughter. She meets and falls in love with Han Kyu-jin, who happens to be the father-in-law of her friend and former sister-in-law, Wang Se-bin. Their lives change when Soon-young marries Kyu-jin and becomes Se-bin's mother-in-law. They have to adjust to their new roles in the family and try to get along with each other.

Cast
Wang family
Lee Yu-ri as Ji Soon-young
Kang Sung-min as Wang Se-joon (husband)
Seo Ji-young as Wang Se-bin (sister-in-law)
Kim Ha-kyun as Wang Man-gil (father-in-law)
Kim Chung as Ha Eun-shil (mother-in-law)
Lee Chan-joo as Wang Saet-byul (Soon-young's adopted daughter)

Han family
Lee Chang-hoon as Han Kyu-jin
Lee Joong-moon as Han Joo-myung (son)
Hong In-young as Han Joo-ran (daughter)
Kim Soo-mi as Hong Bo-ok (mother)

Ji Soon-young's family
Son Hwa-ryung as Hwang Mo-ran (cousin)
Jung Woo as Baek Dong-soo (Mo-ran's husband)
Lee Jong-nam as Go Min-ja (aunt, Mo-ran's mother)

Han Kyu-jin's office
Kim Ji-wan as Kim Sang-soo
Park Yong-ki as Lee Yong-joo (office manager)
Sa Hee as Na Chae-young

Extended cast
Hwang Dong-soo as Oh Dong-jae
Kim Na-young as Noh Eun-kyung
Min Joon-hyun
Kim Ga-eun
Kim Joon-hyung

References

External links
Daring Women official SBS website 

Seoul Broadcasting System television dramas
Korean-language television shows
2010 South Korean television series debuts
2010 South Korean television series endings
2000s South Korean television series
Television series by Pan Entertainment